Wohlers is a surname. Notable people with the surname include:

 Horst Wohlers (born 1949), German football player and manager
 Johan Wohlers (1811–1885), New Zealand missionary
 Jürgen Wohlers (born 1945), German basketball player
 Mark Wohlers (born 1970), American baseball player
  Jacob Wohlers  (born 1994), 
American Man

See also
 Wöhler